The Longluan Lake is a lake in Kenting National Park, Hengchun Township, Pingtung County, Taiwan.

History
To solve the flooding problem around the lake area, the government built barriers on the eastern and northern sides of the lake where the elevations are relatively lower.

Geology
The lake lays in a low-laying area which is prone to flooding during rainy seasons. With a span area of 175 hectares and an average depth of 3.5 meters, the lake is the biggest fresh water lake in Taiwan. The lake is surrounded by various vegetation and it consists of various water animals, such as fishes and shrimps. During winter times, the lake area become the place for migratory birds.

Architecture
The lake features the Longluan lake Natural Center located on the western edge of the lake. It exhibits information on birds ecology in Taiwan.

See also
 Geography of Taiwan

References

Lakes of Taiwan
Landforms of Pingtung County